Genappe is a city and municipality of Wallonia located in the Belgian province of Walloon Brabant. On 1 January 2006 Genappe had a total population of 14,136. The total area is 89.57 km2 which gives a population density of 158 inhabitants per km2.

Villages in the municipality of Genappe are:
 Genappe
 Vieux-Genappe
 Bousval

 Baisy-Thy
 Ways
 Houtain-le-Val
 Loupoigne
 Glabais

History

Although his birthplace was probably Boulogne-sur-Mer, one 13th-century chronicler cites Baisy (now Baisy-Thy in Genappe), as the birthplace of Godfrey of Bouillon, the best-known leader of the First Crusade (1096-1099).

Postal history
The Genappe post-office opened before 1830. It used a postal code 48 with bars (before 1864), and 145 with points before 1870. BOUSVAL opened on 8 April 1880.

Postal codes in 1969 (before the merger of municipalities in 1977): 
- 1470 Genappe
- 1471 Loupoigne
- 1472 Vieux-Genappe 
- 1473 Glabais
- 1474 Ways
- 1475 Baisy-Thy
- 1476 Houtain-le-Val
- 1488 Bousval.

Twinned cities
 Narborough, United Kingdom
 Littlethorpe, United Kingdom
 Franklin, Louisiana, United States

See also
 List of protected heritage sites in Genappe

References

External links
 

 
Cities in Wallonia
Municipalities of Walloon Brabant